Tailor Made is the second solo album by Brian Byrne, formerly of I Mother Earth.

Track listing
"All I Need Is Love"
"Tailor Made"
"Beautiful You"
"Mountain Feeling"
"Easy Come"
"Crazy"
"Look For Me Now"
"Home"
"Colder Than The Lake"
"The One, The Only (King of Late Night)"
"Love You More"

Personnel
 Brian Byrne - Vocals, Guitar, Harmonica
 Gerry Finn - Guitar, Banjo, Vocals
 Lorne Hounsell - Guitar, Banjo, Vocals
 Justin Mahoney - Guitar
 Chris LeDrew - Pedal Steel
 Noel Webb - Drums
 Paul Lomond - Bass
 Ryan Lewchuck - Piano
 Dani Strong - Vocals
 Grant Taylor - Drums (track 2)
 Colin Williams - Drum Editing

Album credits
 Engineer, Mixed    - Lorne Hounsell
 Mastered    - Richard G. Benoit
 Artwork     - Shawn Mackenzie
 Photography - Clint McLean
 Album Design - Jimmy Rose

2007 albums